Aaron Griesheimer is an American politician. In 2019, Griesheimer was elected representative for the 61st district of the Missouri House of Representatives, succeeding Justin Alferman.  In 2022, Griesheimer resigned from his position in the state house. He then begin to work for the   SITE Improvement Association.

References 

Living people
Place of birth missing (living people)
Year of birth missing (living people)
Republican Party members of the Missouri House of Representatives
21st-century American politicians